Pedro Fernández may refer to:

 Pedro Fernández (Argentine footballer) (born 1987), Argentine professional footballer
 Pedro Fernández (Paraguayan footballer) (born 1946), Paraguayan footballer who played as a defender
 Pedro Fernández (Venezuelan footballer) (born 1977), Venezuelan footballer who played as a midfielder
 Pedro Fernández (sailor) (born 1964), Cuban Olympic sailor
 Pedro Fernández (singer) (born 1969), Mexican singer, songwriter, actor, and television host